Lake Mary Ann or Tingkkarli, previously known as Mary Ann Dam is situated about  north of Tennant Creek, Northern Territory, Australia, just off the Stuart Highway. It is a man-made dam where some water sports can be conducted such as swimming or canoeing, surrounded by landscaped grassy areas on one side and natural bushland on the other.

History

Waramungu people have lived in the area of Tingkkarli for thousands of years. After colonisation, it was pegged as mining lease GML441E by Nugget Wilson and Bill Howes and Harold Williams. Wilson and Howes named the mine 'Mary Ann' after their respective daughters Mary Jean and Wendy Ann. The nearby by watercourse then became known as Mary Ann Creek or Mary Ann Billabong.

Originally the site was investigated with a view to increase the water supply for Tennant Creek and Peko Mine in the late 1940s, and later again in the mid-1950s. In 1977, local residents proposed that a recreational dam could be constructed close to Tennant Creek. The Northern Territory Government supported the proposal and construction commenced during 1979 and 1980.

It was opened on 24 April 1981 by the Hon Ian Tuxworth and was originally called the Mary Ann Dam.

In 2014, The Federal Court determined seven native title claims in the area of Lake Mary Ann covering 37,000 square kilometres.

References

Many Ann
Tennant Creek